n  was a Polish DTH platform. It was launched on October 12, 2006 and owned by ITI Neovision. On December 31, 2011 the company had reached 929,000 subscribers. On March 21, 2013,   n was merged with Cyfra+ to form nc+.

History
In May 2006, the ITI Group announced the opening of a "new generation" subscription television platform for the autumn of 2006, with TVN and Onet acting as key strategic partners in the upcoming project.

N was unveiled to the public in September 2006, aiming for an October 12 launch date.

Channels 
At closing time, N had 99 encrypted channels (6 in foreign languages), 23 free-to-air channels in Polish, 34 HDTV channels, and 3 3D channels.

In-house channels
Throughout its history, N also had its own in-house channels:
Wojna i Pokój (War and Peace): The channel broadcast movies from the Soviet Union and contemporary Russia, with either Polish voice-over or original Russian audio. Converted to HD in 2012, after which the channel timeshared with Sundance Channel. Shut down in 2013 because of the merger.
O.TV: Channel run by Jerzy Owsiak, broadcasts started in 2007 and ended in 2009. It later ran as a block on ZigZap until 2010.
nTALK: Channel focusing on American and Polish talk shows. Started in 2007 and ended in 2009.
nSPORT: Sports channel. Later integrated into the NC+ offer in 2013 and rebranded in 2014.

VOD 
 VOD collections
 PictureBox – Universal Studios movies
 nSeriale – CBS Television Studios, NBCUniversal, Buena Vista International, 20th Century Fox Television and TVN's TV series
 nPremium VOD – movies presented on nFilm HD channels
 funVOD – set of erotic movies
 VOD Disney – Disney's series
 Premiery VOD – Warner Bros., Miramax Films, Lions Gate Entertainment, SPI International, Columbia Pictures, 20th Century Fox, DreamWorks, Universal Studios and New Line Cinema movies; unlike VOD collections, every movie in "Premiery VOD" is paid separately
 nVOD net
 TVN Player
 HBO on Demand
 National Geographic Channel
 BabyTV

Set-top boxes 
As for 2012 n offers four set-top boxes to their subscribers. Most notably, it is the only DTH platform in Poland that doesn't provide CI modules to use with generic DVB-S2 receivers.

References

External links 
  
Official Internet forum  
Channel and transponder list

Direct broadcast satellite services
Television networks in Poland
TVN (Polish TV channel)